Botrexvirus is a genus of viruses in the order Tymovirales, in the family Alphaflexiviridae. Fungi serve as natural hosts. There is only one species in this genus: Botrytis virus X.

Structure
Viruses in Botrexvirus are non-enveloped, with flexuous and filamentous geometries. The diameter is around 12-13 nm, with a length of 720 nm. Genomes are linear, around 7kb in length. The genome codes for 5 proteins.

Life cycle
Viral replication is cytoplasmic. Entry into the host cell is achieved by penetration into the host cell. Replication follows the positive stranded RNA virus replication model. Positive stranded RNA virus transcription is the method of transcription. The virus exits the host cell by tripartite non-tubule guided viral movement. Fungi serve as the natural host.

References

External links
 Viralzone: Botrexvirus
 ICTV

Alphaflexiviridae
Virus genera